Andre Brown (born August 24, 1990) is a Canadian volleyball player who plays for the Greek club PAOK.

References

1990 births
Living people
Canadian men's volleyball players
Sporting CP volleyball players
Sportspeople from Mississauga